Welshire is an unincorporated community in New Castle County, Delaware, United States. Welshire is located northeast of the intersection of Shipley Road and Baynard Boulevard to the northeast of Wilmington.

References 

Unincorporated communities in New Castle County, Delaware
Unincorporated communities in Delaware